Abbas Fadhel Abdulla Ahmed Maki Al-Asfoor (born on 3 March 1999), is a Bahraini professional football players who plays for the Bahraini national team.

He debuted with the U23 team on 15 August 2018, at the 2018 Asian Games held in Indonesia against South Korea in a 6–0 defeat.

On 3 June 2019, he appeared with the u-22 against Mexico at the World Festival World Toulon tournament in a 2–0 defeat.

Al-Asfoor appeared at the 2020 AFC U-23 Asian Cup in Thailand in a 5-0 match defeat to Thailand.

He made his senior debut on 23 May 2021 in a friendly match against Ukraine in a 1–1 draw.

He had recently last appeared at the 2022 FIFA World Cup qualifying match against Hong Kong in a 4–0 victory on 15 June 2021.

On 21 November 2021, Abdulwahab was included final-23 squad for the 2021 FIFA Arab Cup.

References

1999 births
Living people
Bahraini footballers
Bahrain international footballers
Association football midfielders
Al-Shabab Club (Manama) players